was the fourteenth single by the Japanese band The Blue Hearts and reached #50 on the Oricon charts in 1992. It was part of the band's sixth album, Stick Out.

Details
The B-side track, "Taifū" (台風 Typhoon), is one of the rare songs by The Blue Hearts that uses irregular meter.

References

1993 singles
The Blue Hearts songs
Songs about nuclear war and weapons
Songs written by Hiroto Kōmoto
East West Records singles
1993 songs